The Indian Journal of Sexually Transmitted Diseases and AIDS is a peer-reviewed open-access medical journal that publishes articles about the study of sexually transmitted diseases. It is an official publication of the Indian Association for the Study of Sexually Transmitted Diseases. The editor-in-chief is Y. S. Marfatia.

Abstracting and indexing 
According to the publisher, the journal is indexed in:

 Abstracts on Hygiene and Communicable Diseases
 CAB Abstracts
 EBSCO Publishing
 Excerpta Medica
 InfoTrac
 Global Health
 SCOLOAR
 Tropical Diseases Bulletin

References

External links 
 

Biannual journals
English-language journals
HIV/AIDS in literature
Medknow Publications academic journals
Publications established in 1980
Sexology journals
Academic journals associated with learned and professional societies of India